Erling Nielsen (1 May 1922 – 1 April 1995) was a Danish field hockey player. He competed at the 1948 Summer Olympics and the 1960 Summer Olympics.

References

External links
 

1922 births
1995 deaths
Danish male field hockey players
Olympic field hockey players of Denmark
Field hockey players at the 1948 Summer Olympics
Field hockey players at the 1960 Summer Olympics
People from Kalundborg
Sportspeople from Region Zealand